Visnaga daucoides is a species of flowering plant in the carrot family known by many common names, including toothpick-plant, toothpickweed, bisnaga, khella, or sometimes bishop's weed. It is native to Europe, Asia, and North Africa, but it can be found throughout the world as an introduced species.

Description
This is an erect annual plant growing from a taproot to a maximum height near . The inflorescence is a compound umbel of white flowers similar to those of other Apiaceae species. The fruit is a compressed oval-shaped body less than 3 millimeters long. This  species is a source of khellin, a diuretic extract.

Like its close relative Ammi majus, Visnaga daucoides is commonly seen in gardens where it is grown from seed annually.

Some authorities regard Visnaga daucoides as a synonym of Ammi visnaga; and it is still widely referenced under that name.

Traditional medicine
In Egypt, a tea made from the fruit of this species has been used as an herbal remedy for kidney stones.

Preparations of the fruits have also been used for angina pectoris therapy.

Laboratory research
Laboratory rat studies show that the extract slows the buildup of calcium oxalate crystals in the kidneys and acts as a diuretic. Its clinical effects in humans are unknown.

Chemical constituents
Khellin, a chemical compound obtained from Visnaga daucoides, was used at one time as a smooth muscle relaxant, but its use is now limited due to adverse side effects. Amiodarone and cromoglycate are synthetic derivatives of khellin with fewer side effects which were developed for use in modern medicine.

Visnagin is another chemical compound found in Visnaga daucoides, which is toxic if ingested in the pure state. Visnadine is a natural vasodilator found in Visnaga daucoides.

References

External links

 Jepson Manual Treatment
 
 Photo gallery
 Botanical drawing
 Fructus Ammi Visnagae WHO Monographs on Selected Medicinal Plants - Volume 3

Apioideae
Flora of Spain
Flora of Israel
Flora of Palestine (region)
Medicinal plants of Africa
Medicinal plants of Asia
Medicinal plants of Europe
Flora of Malta